Batuceper Station is a railway station located at Poris Plawad, Cipondoh, Tangerang, Indonesia. Although named as Batuceper, but the location of this station is not in the district of Batuceper, rather it is located at Cipondoh district of Tangerang. The station serves Greater Jakarta commuter rail and Soekarno–Hatta Airport Rail Link.

This station is located opposite of Poris Plawad Bus Terminal. Next to the old station building, a new station building is built to serve the Soekarno–Hatta Airport Rail Link service exclusively. The new station is equipped with facilities such as vending machine, turnstiles, escalator, ATM gallery, waiting lounge, commercial area, meeting room, and mosque.

Building and layout 

The station building consists of two parts, namely the south side which is managed by KAI Commuter and the north side which is managed by KAI Bandara. Initially this station was just a single building on the south side and had two railway lines, both of which were straight tracks for KRL Commuterline stops. Since the completion of the construction of the branch line to the Soekarno–Hatta International Airport, the lines at this station have increased to four with the existing lines 1 and 2 being changed to lines 3 and 4. The new lines 1 and 2 are a straight line from and towards the airport.

The north side of the station building only serves Soekarno-Hatta Airport rail link trips. The station's new building began operations on 26 December 26, 2017. Since 18 July 2019, the two buildings are connected by a pedestrian bridge.

Services

Passenger services

Airport rail link

Commuterline

Supporting transportation

See also
Soekarno–Hatta International Airport 
Jakarta Metro Commuter Rail

References

External links
 

Tangerang
Railway stations in Banten